Penguin is a 2020 Indian Tamil-language mystery thriller film written and directed by Eashvar Karthic in his directorial debut. The film was produced by Kaarthekeyen Santhanam, Sudhan Sundaram and Jayaram, under Stone Bench Films, backed by Karthik Subbaraj, and Passion Studios respectively. It stars Keerthy Suresh as a pregnant woman who is traumatised by nightmares about the unsolved kidnapping of her first child, and later embarks on a mission to solve the mystery of his disappearance.

The project was announced in August 2019. Eashvar Karthic wrote the script within 18 days, and shooting was completed within 36 days between September and November 2019 at Kodaikanal. The film features cinematography by Kharthik Palani and editing was done by Anil Krish; the film has music scored by Santhosh Narayanan.

Penguin was released directly through Amazon Prime Video on 19 June 2020, after a theatrical release failed to happen due to the COVID-19 lockdown in India. The film received mixed reviews from critics, praising the performance of Keerthy and the cinematography whereas the inconsistent writing received criticism.

Plot 
The film starts off with a sinister-looking stranger in a Charlie Chaplin mask holding a bloody bag while walking into a lake. Meanwhile, we meet Rhythm, a young woman who resides in Kodaikanal, is happily married to her husband Gautham and is seven months pregnant. One day, her husband is off at a conference and tells Rhythm to go to her checkup appointment later via audio recording. He also tells her that if she's lonely, she can spend time with her two best friends, Abi and Bhavana. While at the hospital, Rhythm recalls her past.

6 years ago, Rhythm was married to another man named Raghu and together they had a son named Ajay. Ajay meant the world to Rhythm and she always spent her time with him. One day while Rhythm is reading a story about a missing penguin and its mother, Raghu tells Rhythm that her friend Bhavana's father has passed away. Raghu and Rhythm go to Bhavana's house with Ajay. There they run into Rhythm's other friend Abi, and her husband Kathir. Rhythm and Raghu go into the house where they see Bhavana's mother nearly mad with grief and Bhavana unresponsive, in a dazed state. Rhythm tries to reassure Bhavana, but Bhavana doesn't respond. Raghu tells Rhythm to give Bhavana her space and the two leave the house. It is at that moment that they realize that Ajay has gone missing. Rhythm is immediately worried and concerned about Ajay's whereabouts. Raghu says that Ajay couldn't have gone far and that they should not disturb anyone because they are all grieving. But after searching a lot, they could not find Ajay and others pitch in to help. Here it can be seen that Raghu is a bit toxic towards Rhythm when he blames her for Ajay's disappearance. They search everywhere in the house but Ajay is not there. Eventually, Kathir finds Ajay outside the house, and Rhythm promises that she'll never leave Ajay again.

The film cuts back to the present where a nurse tells Rhythm that she is next to see the doctor. While she is waiting, she plays peek a boo with a little girl but when she closes her eyes, the girl is nowhere to be found. She eventually finds out that the girl's mom picked her up. But as she sees a big hoard of insects on the ceiling she has a gory flashback and passes out. During the appointment, it is revealed that Rhythm is deathly scared of bugs and the doctor also tells Rhythm to forget the past and to avoid going to the lake. Despite the doctor's warning, Rhythm goes to the lake and her flashback continues.

One day at the same spot near the lake, Rhythm was waiting to pick Ajay up from school. Ajay's friend Pavi, goes to Rhythm upset that Ajay won't play with her. When Rhythm promises that she will tell Ajay to play with Pavi two more hours the next day, Pavi says no. When Rhythm asks her why, Pavi says that all the kids heard a whistling sound from the forest and Ajay went into the forest following it. Pavi says that there was a man in a Charlie Chaplin mask in the forest. And after that, Pavi says that she never saw Ajay again. Rhythm is immediately worried. She calls the police and the police all go to look in the lake. Rhythm, in her grief, falls into a dazed state. Raghu, Abi, Kathir, and Bhavana all try to console her and the police look in the lake and the forest but Ajay isn't there. The police find a bouquet with human intestines that come with a card that says 'Rest in Peace'. Upon seeing the bouquet, Rhythm passes out. There were bugs swarming the bouquet and it is revealed that this is the cause of Rhythm's fear of insects. The doctor explains to Raghu that Rhythm has started to associate bugs with death and says that if she doesn't think about what happened she will be fine and can go outside. Days pass, then weeks, then a year has passed. Rhythm starts to pass out flyers to everyone. Then, an important lead is found and Rhythm and Raghu go to the forest. They find Ajay's bloodstained clothes and the police say that it is very likely that Ajay is dead. But Rhythm refuses to believe it and says that he is fine. Later, Abi tells Rhythm that if she can pass this phase then a lot of surprises will come in life and that she should start moving on. Abi talks about how Bhavana moved on after a guy she loved in college dumped her, and how she and Kathir have no children even after seven years of marriage and still continue living. Bhavana says that this isn't the end and that this is when Rhythm's life will start. The three friends then embrace.

Back in the present, while Rhythm is thinking about her happy times with Ajay, she sees an injured man being chased by a stranger in a Charlie Chaplin mask. The man tells her to run and also tells her that he saw the stranger with a missing child. Rhythms manages to escape, but sees the killer kill the man. The killer sees Rhythm but lets her escape for unknown reasons. She thinks that the missing child is Ajay and calls a friend of hers who is a police inspector. But her friend says that it's not possible because another girl named Anjana has also gone missing. But she still goes back to the lake, and on her way there, she sees a child run in front of her car. Upon looking at him, she realizes that the child is Ajay. An ambulance and the police arrive and Ajay is taken to the hospital. DNA tests confirm that the boy is Ajay and Rhythm is overjoyed. Rhythm's friends arrive and they are also happy about the news. At the hospital, Rhythm sees Anjana's mother who reminds Rhythm of herself when Ajay disappeared. Anajana's mom asks if Ajay can tell her where Anjana is. Rhythm explains that Ajay hasn't talked yet. Anjana's mother leaves the hospital crying. A shocked Raghu arrives at the hospital after being informed about Ajay and upon seeing Ajay's state he is heartbroken. Doctor David informs Rhythm that Ajay has been tortured by his kidnapper and hasn't spoken a word to anyone. Eventually, Raghu and Rhythm are left alone and a flashback regarding their marriage is shown.

After they can't find Ajay, Rhythm becomes depressed and Raghu's toxic behavior causes them to divorce when Raghu blames Ajay's disappearance on Rhythm. They both go their separate ways.

Back in the present day, Raghu apologizes for his behavior and lets Ajay go home with Rhythm. When Ajay goes to Rhythm's house, he is still very quiet and is very uncomfortable. Gautham says that Ajay can call him dad if he wants. Here a flashback of how Rhythm met Gautham is shown.

One year ago, while Rhythm is dazedly handing out flying and walking away, Gautham picks one up. He understands what she is going through and says that he will accept her just the way she is, whether she can forget her past or not. Rhythm and Gautham eventually marry. The film is brought back to the present.

One night, she overhears Ajay singing Twinkle, Twinkle Little Star, and sees his drawings of the kidnapper which imply that the kidnapper is still following him. One day at a carnival, she sees the kidnapper when meeting up with Raghu, but fails to follow him. She also loses Ajay but Raghu manages to find him. However, Ajay stabs the driver. When Raghu tells Ajay to drop his weapon, Ajay surprisingly listens to Raghu. When Rhythm sees a lot of insects, she passes out. Raghu brings her to her home because Gautham couldn't be reached. In the middle of the night, Ajay attempts to stab Rhythm's stomach but stops when she moves. Later the kidnapper breaks into Rhythm's house and communicates with Ajay via sign language. Rhythm tries to stop the kidnapper but he overpowers her and escapes. Doctor David suggests that Rhythm take Ajay to a speech therapist. On the way there though, Anjana's mom faints in the road so Gautham takes her to the hospital. Meanwhile, Rhythm's dog Cyrus finds human organs in a dumpster. Cyrus leads Rhythm to a house that belongs to David. Suspecting David, Rhythm finds a way to make him leave the house. She searches his house and finds a secret room where she finds Anjana. Cyrus helps Rhythm save Anjana and Ajay from David and gets David arrested. Anjana is reunited with her parents. However, Ajay is injured so Rhythm tells Gautham to take him to the hospital while she goes to the police station. When Rhythm questions David, it is revealed that he kills kids for their organs. David also reveals that if he had kidnapped Ajay, Ajay would have been dead. It is revealed that David wrote the Rest In Peace cards and sent the bouquet to divert the police from his crimes. David also says that the kidnapper is around Rhythm and that she has to look at things from a different point of view to figure out who the kidnapper is. She starts to suspect Raghu because Ajay listened to him. She attempts to call Gautham but he doesn't answer. She reaches the hospital where she sees that Gautham has been attacked. Gautham holds a glove and reveals that the kidnapper is female and says that she took Ajay. Rhythm runs through the clues in her head and figures out who the kidnapper is but she doesn't know why they kidnapped Ajay. She gets in the car and drives to a house. There is a blurred portrait of a woman. The kidnapper shows up and pulls off her mask revealing that she is Bhavana, Rhythm's childhood friend. Rhythm asks where Ajay is and Bhavana says that she'll tell Rhythm if she has a drink. Rhythm drinks the drink. Bhavana says that Rhythm will do anything for Ajay because Ajay is her world. But Bhavana says that when her world was shattered and she tried to fix it, she would see Rhythm in every shard. Bhavana's past is revealed through a brief flashback.

When Bhavana and Rhythm were little, everyone put Rhythm in the spotlight and Bhavana was left behind. As they got older, this behavior continued. When Bhavana showed her sports trophies to her parents, they would always dismiss her accomplishments saying that Bhavana is not good in studies, but Rhythm was at the top of the ranks in school. Bhavana was happy that who she loved was her choice, but even that guy (the guy who supposedly dumped Bhavana) chose Rhythm over Bhavana. When Rhythm was engaged, Bhavana's parents organized Rhythm's marriage because she was an orphan, forgetting that they had a daughter who wasn't engaged at home. And as everyone compared Bhavana to Rhythm, Bhavana started to lose her identity. So she created one of her own. When she saw how worried Rhythm was after Ajay went missing for five minutes, Bhavana decided to kidnap Ajay for one day and return him. But when she saw how upset Rhythm was, she kept Ajay locked up for one day, then a week, and just like that 6 years passed. Bhavana says that when David copied her style she was a little scared, but she kept everything under control. But one day, Abi's husband Kathir follows Bhavana to an underground room where Ajay's clothes were found, and sees Bhavana slapping Ajay. Bhavana stabs Kathir and forces Ajay to stab Kathir. Kathir tells Ajay to run, and Ajay does so while Bhavana kills Kathir. Ajay runs until he runs in front of Rhythm's car, bringing the film back to the present.

Bhavana says that Rhythm has a choice between saving her unborn child or Ajay. It is revealed that the drink was poisoned and that Ajay was given the same drink. Bhavana says that no matter what she will have to make a comparison and that someone will die anyways. Bhavana says that Rhythm will finally understand how Bhavana felt all those years. Bhavana says that Rhythm will be haunted by her choice forever and that when she remembers her choice she will remember Bhavana. After saying that, Bhavana shoots herself in the head. Rhythm runs outside, finds the underground room with Cyrus' help, and frees Ajay. In the room, she also finds Kathir's decomposing body. She and Ajay try to escape but the poison starts to affect Rhythm. Ajay speaks for the first time and calls her mom. He then runs outside and finds help.

Rhythm is hospitalized, and since she had a small dose of poison, both she and the baby are safe. Ajay returns to his normal playful self. Rhythm finishes the story about the penguin that she read to Ajay 6 years ago and it is revealed that Rhythm represents the mother penguin. Gautham talks about how if it weren't for Kathir, Ajay would have never been found. He also wonders how Abi, Kathir's wife will lead her life alone. But Rhythm says that Abi won't be alone because she is pregnant and has decided to move on for her child. Rhythm also says that everyone will be there to support Abi. Gautham says that a mother is always a special relationship, but Rhythm says that "It's not a relationship, it's an attitude." The doctor comes in and Gautham, Rhythm, and Ajay look at the baby. Ajay comments that Rhythm is lucky to have a baby, but Gautham says that the baby is lucky because it can trust its mother and enter the world bravely, without any fear.

Cast 

 Keerthy Suresh as Rhythm aka Ritu
 Riya Manoj as Young Rhythm
 Linga as Raghu
 Madhampatty Rangaraj as Gautham Siddharth
 Advaith Vinod as Ajay
 Umar as young Ajay
 Mathi as Dr. David
 Muthazhagan as Charlie Chaplin
 Nithya Kriupa as Bhavana
 Sai Jivitha as young Bhavana
 Shakthi as teenage Bhavana
 Harini Rameshkrishnan as Abhi
 Thejank as Kathir
 Maddy as Cyrus
 Murali as Bhavana's father
 Aishwarya Ramani as Anjana
 Uma Shankar as Bhavana's mother
 Tharini Suresh as Anjana's mother

Production

Development 

In August 2019, it was announced that Keerthy Suresh had signed on an untitled "mystery thriller" film to be produced by Karthik Subbaraj under his banner Stone Bench Films, and directed by debutant Eashvar Karthic. The film, which was Stone Bench Films' third production venture, was also produced by Kaarthekeyen Santhanam, Sudhan Sundaram and Jayaram under the banner Passion Studios. It was also marked as Keerthy's second female-centric film, after her performance in Mahanati (2018), which received critical acclaim. Eashvar wrote the script of the film within a span of 18 days. The film was launched as a Tamil and Telugu bilingual; however, the Telugu version was dropped in favor of a dubbed release.

The film's technical crew members included Santhosh Narayanan as the film's composer, Kharthik Palani was chosen to handle the cinematography, whereas Anil Krish took in charge of editing the film. Kharthik Palani assisted Tirru, before making his debut as the cinematographer in the film, he stated the preparation work took around three months, further adding that the fairly limited time allotted for shooting, did help in a cause, despite the unpredictable weather. He also experimented with camera angles which he stated that no recent Tamil film has had as many wide shots.

On 17 October 2019, the makers unveiled the first look of the film, revealing the title as Penguin. The first look features Keerthy playing a pregnant woman in the film. Keerthy, in an interview with Scroll.in, described the film as "an emotional thriller, which is mostly about motherhood and the bond between mother and son. It's about the trauma she experiences when she loses her son. The whole story is set over four days, during which she tries to find her son." Apart from Keerthy, the film features Linga and Madhampatty Rangaraj in pivotal roles in addition to several newcomers.<ref>{{Cite web |last=Karthi |first=E. Sudharshan |date=4 November 2019 |title=ஏழே கேரக்டர்ஸ்... கொடைக்கானலில் 32 நாள்... பென்ச்மார்க் கீர்த்தி! – 'பெண்குயின்' அப்டேட்ஸ் |trans-title=`` Seven Characters ... 32 Days in Kodaikanal ... Benchmark Keerthi!  – `Penguin 'Updates |url=https://cinema.vikatan.com/tamil-cinema/madhampatty-rangaraj-shares-about-his-experience-in-penguin-movie |url-status=live |archive-url=https://web.archive.org/web/20200610003952/https://cinema.vikatan.com/tamil-cinema/madhampatty-rangaraj-shares-about-his-experience-in-penguin-movie |archive-date=10 June 2020 |access-date=10 June 2020 |website=Ananda Vikatan |language=ta}}</ref>

 Filming 
Principal photography began on 12 September 2019 at Kodaikanal. Keerthy had experienced about the film's shooting in cold destinations such as Kodaikkanal, and also about the challenges faced during early starts and long days. During the shooting in Kodaikanal, the shooting lights fell on a beehive and disturbed the bees, which stung many crew members including Keerthy, and it was after treatment that Keerthy and the team resumed shooting. Principal photography wrapped on 3 November 2019.

 Soundtrack Penguins original soundtrack album features only one song composed by Santhosh Narayanan. Titled "Kolame", it was composed by Santhosh at his Future Tense Recording Studio located in Chennai, and he composed the songs and background score of the film, during the period of the COVID-19 lockdown in India, after when the Tamil Nadu government granted permission for post-production works of the film. According to a source report, it stated that Penguin’s music album is one of the first albums to have been completely created during this ongoing period.

"Kolame" was released as a single on 16 June 2020, by composer Anirudh Ravichander, who also released its Telugu version "Praname", and Malayalam version "Omale", simultaneously on the same day. Susha lent the vocals for the song in both the versions, which had lyrics written by Vivek for the Tamil and Malayalam version, while Vennelekanti wrote its Telugu version.

The soundtrack album features seven instrumental tracks, along with the song "Kolame" which was released by Sony Music South, on 10 August 2020. The album also features an additional track "Thaai" (only for the Tamil version), which had lyrics written by Vivek and sung by Anand Aravindakshan. It was not included in the soundtrack album, as well as in the film, but released separately on 2 September 2020.

 Release Penguin was originally scheduled for a theatrical release. However, on 15 May 2020, the over-the-top media service (OTT) platform Amazon Prime Video announced that the film would be made available directly on the streaming platform from 19 June 2020, as a result of theatres being closed due to the COVID-19 lockdown. It became the second Tamil film to be released directly on an OTT platform during the lockdown, after Ponmagal Vandhal which released that year. The film was released simultaneously in Tamil with dubbed versions in Telugu and Malayalam.

 Reception Penguin received mixed reviews from critics. S. Srivatsan of The Hindu wrote, "Penguin is not a bad film but Eashvar's idea of writing suspense gets clumsier as the story progresses, the film is inconsistent for the most part, despite some brilliantly-imagined sequences." Shubra Gupta of The Indian Express gave the film 1.5 out of 5 stars stating "Keerthy Suresh tries to make the best of a bad job, and is quite a sight when squaring up to monsters, but the proceedings let her down." M. Suganth of The Times of India gave the film 2.5 out of 5 stars stating "Eashvar Karthic provides us the answers in this emotional thriller that might be underwhelming compared to recent serial killer thrillers, but isn't a total letdown, especially for a first film. Part of its success is due to the convincing performance of Keerthy Suresh, which brings out the vulnerability and the strength in this character."

Gauthaman Bhaskaran of the News18 gave 1.5 out of 5 stating "A thriller that loses its way not long after it begins to roll." Nandini Ramanath of Scroll.in stated that "Eashvar Karthic's 132-minute film stumbles along on the strength of its visuals and Keerthy Suresh's suitably fraught performance." Karthik Keramalu from The Quint gave the film 3 out of 5 stars and stated "Keerthy Suresh gave a good performance but the thriller itself was lazy". Baradwaj Rangan of Film Companion stated "Even the title has no motivation, unless you consider that the penguin is a bird that cannot fly. This is a film that never takes off."

In a positive note, Ranjani Krishnakumar of Firstpost gave 3 out of 5 stating "Penguin draws a clear line – this is a story about a mother. Rhythm is only that. For her, and for the film, that is enough." Sowmya Rajendran of The News Minute gave 3.5 out of 5 stating "Penguin has its moments and Keerthy Suresh indeed makes the film very watchable. But it is probably time to ask if this pressure to include 'twists' isn't killing a good story only because it seems too simple." Haricharan Pudipeddi of Hindustan Times'' stated "Keerthy Suresh proves yet again she's an artist with a lot of potential. If not for her commendable performance, the film would’ve struggled to make an impact with its convoluted writing. She owns the film from the first frame to the last, and she delivers one of her career-best performances."

References

External links 
 

2020 direct-to-video films
2020 directorial debut films
2020 films
2020 thriller films
2020s mystery thriller films
2020s Tamil-language films
Amazon Prime Video original films
Films not released in theaters due to the COVID-19 pandemic
Indian mystery thriller films
Indian pregnancy films
Films scored by Santhosh Narayanan